Events of the year 2023 in the Democratic Republic of the Congo.

Events

January 
 January 16 – Ten people are killed and 39 others are injured when a bomb explodes at a Pentecostal church in Kasindi, North Kivu, Democratic Republic of the Congo. The Islamic State has claimed responsibility for the attack.
 January 18 – The United Nations reports the discovery of mass graves in Ituri Province, containing the bodies of 49 civilians. CODECO militants are suspected of being behind the killings.
 January 23 – Allied Democratic Forces insurgents kill 23 people for consuming beer at a bar in North Kivu. The jihadists also torch several homes and shops in the village.
 January 31 – Pope Francis begins his first papal visit to the Democratic Republic of the Congo. He will also visit South Sudan on the same trip.

February 

 February 1 – M23 insurgents capture the town of Kitshanga in North Kivu, after days of heavy fighting. The DRC's army confirm the withdrawal of its troops from the town, saying it was a "tactical move to protect civilians".
 February 27 – M23 rebels seize the town of Rubaya and the Rubaya coltan mines in North Kivu, after government forces withdraw from the area.

March 

 March 4 – Kivu conflict: Burundi deploys 100 troops to the eastern Democratic Republic of the Congo to help the country fight insurgencies by militias, including M23. 
March 9 – During an attack at least 36 people are killed in Mukondi.
March 12 – Nineteen people are killed by suspected Islamist insurgents in Kirindera, North Kivu.

Scheduled 
 20 December – 2023 Democratic Republic of the Congo general election

Deaths 

 4 February – Léon Engulu, 88, politician, governor of Katanga (1968–1970), minister of the interior (1990–1991) and senator (2003–2018).

References 

 
Democratic Republic of the Congo
Democratic Republic of the Congo
2020s in the Democratic Republic of the Congo
Years of the 21st century in the Democratic Republic of the Congo